Crellidae is a family of marine demosponges in the order Poecilosclerida.

Characteristics
Growth forms are varied and include branching, club-shaped, massive and encrusting. Identification of members of this family is based on microscopic examination of the spicules in their skeleton. The choanosomal skeleton is composed of tornotes while the ectosomal skeleton consists of a tangential crust of spined styles or oxeas. The microscleres are mostly arcuate isochelae.

Genera
Anisocrella Topsent, 1927
Crella Gray, 1867
Crellastrina Topsent, 1927
Crellomima Rezvoi, 1925
Spirorhabdia Topsent, 1918

References

Poecilosclerida